Sal Yusuf is an Indian actor and stand-up comedian who works in Malayalam, Kannada, and Hindi-language films.

Career 
Sal Yusuf moved from London to Banglore, where he became a stand-up comedian and is also a part of the comedy group, The Improv. He was one of the first stand-up comedians in Bangalore. After appearing in several commercials, theatre productions, and playing supporting roles in several Malayalam films, Sal Yusuf made his Hindi film debut with Tiger Zinda Hai (2017) portraying one of the antagonists. He made his Kannada lead debut with French Biriyani along with Danish Sait, who is also a part of The Improv. In the film, he plays a French emigrant who comes to Bangalore.

Filmography

Web series

References

External links 
TED Talk

Living people
Indian stand-up comedians
Male actors in Malayalam cinema
Male actors in Kannada cinema
Male actors in Hindi cinema
Indian male film actors
Year of birth missing (living people)